FSSF may refer to:

FSSF, the joint Canadian-U.S. First Special Service Force Devil's Brigade.
FSSF, the ICAO Airport Code for Frégate Island Airport, an airfield serving Frégate Island in the Seychelles.
FSSF, the F# Software Foundation, promoting the F# programming language